Daniel Patrick Macnee (6 February 1922 – 25 June 2015) was an English film and television actor. After serving in the Royal Navy during World War II, he began his acting career in Canada. Despite having some small film roles, Macnee spent much of his early career in playing small roles in American and Canadian television shows. In 1961, he landed the role of secret agent John Steed in the English television series The Avengers. The show was a success running for eight seasons from 1961 to 1969 and was revived in 1976 as The New Avengers. The show was a major breakthrough for Macnee and led to his roles in many films including This Is Spinal Tap and A View to a Kill as well as continuing to appear in both English and US television shows up until 2001.

Early life and career
The elder of two sons, Macnee was born in Paddington, London, England, on 6 February 1922; to Daniel Macnee (1878–1952) and British socialite Dorothea Mabel Macnee (née Henry) (1896–1984). His father, who was a grandson of the Scottish artist Sir Daniel Macnee, trained race horses in Lambourn, and was known for his dress sense; he had served as an officer in the Yorkshire Dragoons in the First World War. His maternal grandmother was Frances Alice Hastings (1870–1945), who was the daughter of Vice-Admiral George Fowler Hastings and granddaughter of The 12th Earl of Huntingdon. His younger brother James, known as Jimmy, was born five years later. Macnee saw himself as a Scot.

Macnee's parents separated after his mother came out as a lesbian. His father later moved to India, and his mother began to live with her wealthy partner, Evelyn Spottiswoode, whose money came from the Dewar's whisky business. Macnee referred to her in his autobiography as "Uncle Evelyn", and she helped pay for his schooling. He was educated at Summer Fields School and Eton College, where he was a member of the Officer Training Corps and was one of the guard of honour for King George V at St George's Chapel in 1936. He was later expelled from Eton for selling pornography and being a bookmaker for his fellow students.

Macnee studied acting at the Webber Douglas Academy of Dramatic Art, but shortly before he was to perform in his first West End leading role, which would have had him acting alongside Vivien Leigh, he was called up for the Royal Navy. He joined as an ordinary seaman in October 1942 and was commissioned a sub-lieutenant in June 1943, becoming a navigator on Motor Torpedo Boats in the English Channel and North Sea. Reassigned as first lieutenant on a second MTB, Macnee caught bronchitis just before D-Day; while he was recuperating in hospital, his boat and crew were lost in action. Two of the crew received the Distinguished Service Medal. He left the Royal Navy in 1946 as a lieutenant.

Macnee nurtured his acting career in Canada early on, but he also appeared as an uncredited extra in the British films Pygmalion (1938), The Life and Death of Colonel Blimp (1943) and Laurence Olivier's Hamlet (1948), as well as some live TV dramas for the BBC, before graduating to credited roles in such films as Scrooge (US: A Christmas Carol, 1951), as young Jacob Marley; the Gene Kelly vehicle Les Girls (1957), as an Old Bailey barrister; and the war film The Battle of the River Plate (1956). Between these occasional movie roles, Macnee spent the better part of the 1950s working in dozens of small roles in American and Canadian television and theatre, including an appearance in an episode of One Step Beyond ("Night of April 14th") and The Twilight Zone ("Judgment Night") in 1959. Disappointed in his limited career development, in the late 1950s Macnee was daily smoking 80 cigarettes and drinking a bottle of whisky.

Not long before his career-making role in The Avengers, Macnee took a break from acting and served as one of the London-based producers for the classic documentary series The Valiant Years, based on the Second World War memoirs of Winston Churchill.

The Avengers

While working in London on the Churchill series, Macnee was offered the role in The Avengers (1961–69), (originally intended to be known as Jonathan Steed), for which he became best known. The series was conceived as a vehicle for Ian Hendry, who played the lead role of Dr. David Keel in a sequel to an earlier series, Police Surgeon (1960), while John Steed was his assistant. Macnee, though, became the lead after Hendry's departure at the end of the first season. Macnee played opposite a succession of glamorous female partners: Honor Blackman, Diana Rigg and Linda Thorson. Of the 161 completed episodes, Macnee appeared in all but two, both from the first season.

Although Macnee evolved in the role as the series progressed, the key elements of Steed's persona and appearance were there from very early on: the slightly mysterious demeanour and, increasingly, the light, suave, flirting tone with ladies (and always with his female assistants). Finally, from the episodes with Blackman onwards, the trademark bowler hat and umbrella completed the image. Although it traditionally was associated with London "city gents", the ensemble of suit, umbrella and bowler had developed in the post-war years as mufti for ex-servicemen attending Armistice Day ceremonies. Steed's sartorial style may also have been drawn from Macnee's father. Macnee, alongside designer Pierre Cardin, adapted the look into a style all his own, and he went on to design several outfits himself for Steed based on the same basic theme. Steed was also the central character of The New Avengers (1976–77), in which he was teamed with agents named Purdey (Joanna Lumley) and Mike Gambit (Gareth Hunt).

Macnee insisted on, and was proud of, almost never carrying a gun in the original series; when asked why, he explained, "I'd just come out of a World War in which I'd seen most of my friends blown to bits." Lumley later said she did all the gun-slinging in The New Avengers for the same reason.

When asked in June 1982 which Avengers female lead was his favourite, Macnee declined to give a specific answer. "Well, I'd rather not say. To do so would invite trouble," he told TV Week magazine. Macnee did provide his evaluation of the female leads. Of Honor Blackman he said, "She was wonderful, presenting the concept of a strong-willed, independent and liberated woman just as that sort of woman was beginning to emerge in society." Diana Rigg was "One of the world's great actresses. A superb comedienne. I'm convinced that one day she'll be Dame Diana" (his prediction came true in 1994). Linda Thorson was "one of the sexiest women alive" while Joanna Lumley was "superb in the role of Purdey. An actress who is only now realising her immense potential."

Macnee co-wrote two original novels based upon The Avengers during the 1960s, titled Dead Duck and Deadline. He hosted the documentary The Avengers: The Journey Back (1998), directed by Clyde Lucas.

For the critically lambasted film version of The Avengers (1998), he lent his voice in a cameo as Invisible Jones. The character John Steed was taken over by Ralph Fiennes.

Later roles

Macnee's other significant roles included playing Sir Godfrey Tibbett opposite Roger Moore in the James Bond film A View to a Kill (1985), as Major Crossley in The Sea Wolves (again with Moore), guest roles in Encounter, Alias Smith and Jones (for Glen A. Larson), Magnum, P.I., Hart to Hart, Murder, She Wrote and The Love Boat. Although his best known role was heroic, many of his television appearances were as villains; among them were his roles of both the demonic Count Iblis and his provision of the character voice of the Cylons' Imperious Leader in Battlestar Galactica, also for Glen A. Larson, for which he also supplied the show's introductory voiceover. He also presented the American paranormal series Mysteries, Magic and Miracles. Macnee appeared on Broadway as the star of Anthony Shaffer's mystery Sleuth in 1972–73. He subsequently headlined the national tour of that play.

Macnee reunited with Diana Rigg in her short-lived sitcom Diana (1973) in a single episode. Other television appearances include a guest appearance on Columbo in the episode "Troubled Waters" (1975); and playing Major Vickers in For the Term of his Natural Life (1983). He had recurring roles in the crime series Gavilan with Robert Urich and in the short-lived satire on big business, Empire (1984), as Dr. Calvin Cromwell. Macnee was known for narrating various James Bond Documentaries on Special Edition DVD. He also narrated the documentary Ian Fleming: 007's Creator (2000).

Macnee featured prominently in two editions of the long-running British television series This Is Your Life: in 1978, when he and host Eamonn Andrews, both dressed as Steed, surprised Ian Hendry, and in 1984 when he was the edition's unsuspecting subject.

He also appeared in several cult films: in The Howling (1981), as Dr. George Waggner (named whimsically after the director of The Wolf Man, 1941) and as Sir Denis Eton-Hogg in the rockumentary comedy This Is Spinal Tap (1984). He played Dr. Stark in The Creature Wasn't Nice (1981), also called Spaceship and Naked Space. Macnee played the role of actor David Mathews in the television movie Rehearsal for Murder (1982), which starred Robert Preston and Lynn Redgrave. The movie was from a script written by Columbo co-creators Richard Levinson and William Link. He took over Leo G. Carroll's role as the head of U.N.C.L.E. His character being Sir John Raleigh in Return of the Man from U.N.C.L.E.: The Fifteen-Years-Later Affair (1983), produced by Michael Sloan. He was featured in the science fiction television movie Super Force (1990) as E. B. Hungerford (the series which followed only featured Macnee's voice as a Max Headroom-style computer simulation of his character), as a supporting character in the parody film Lobster Man from Mars (1989) as Professor Plocostomos and in the television film The Return of Sam McCloud (1989) as Tom Jamison. He made an appearance in Frasier (2001), and several episodes of the American sci-fi series Nightman as Dr. Walton, a psychiatrist who would advise Johnny/Nightman. Macnee appeared in two episodes of the series Kung Fu: The Legend Continues (1993–94) and was a retired agent in a handful of instalments of Spy Game (1997–98).

Macnee made numerous TV commercials including one around 1990 for Swiss Chalet, the Canadian restaurant chain, and a year or so before, a commercial for the Sterling Motor Car Company. Over the James Bond theme, the car duels with a motorcycle assailant at high speed through mountainous territory, ultimately eludes the foe, and reaches its destination. Macnee steps out of the car and greets viewers with a smile, saying "I suppose you were expecting someone else". Macnee was the narrator for several "behind-the-scenes" featurettes for the James Bond series of DVDs and recorded numerous audio books, including the releases of many novels by Jack Higgins. He also recorded the children's books The Musical Life of Gustav Mole and its sequel, The Lost Music (Gustav Mole's War on Noise), both written by Michael Twinn.

Macnee featured in two pop videos: as Steed in original Avengers footage in The Pretenders' video for their song "Don't Get Me Wrong" (1986) and in the promotion for Oasis' video "Don't Look Back in Anger" (1996), as the band's driver, a role similar to that which he played in the James Bond film A View to a Kill (1985). In 1990, his recording with his Avengers co-star Honor Blackman, called "Kinky Boots" (1964), reached the UK Singles Chart after being played on Simon Mayo's BBC Radio One breakfast show.

Sherlock Holmes and Doctor Watson
Macnee appeared in Magnum, P.I. (1984) as a retired British agent who suffered from the delusion that he was Sherlock Holmes, in a season four episode titled Holmes Is Where the Heart Is. He played both Holmes and Dr. Watson on several occasions. He played Watson three times: once alongside Roger Moore's Sherlock Holmes in the television film Sherlock Holmes in New York (1976), and twice with Christopher Lee, first in Sherlock Holmes and the Leading Lady (1991), and then in Incident at Victoria Falls (1992). He played Holmes in another television film The Hound of London (1993), along with the Canadian television film Sherlock Holmes: The Case of the Temporal Nexus (1996). He is thus one of only a small number of actors to have portrayed both Sherlock Holmes and Dr. Watson on screen.

Personal life
Macnee married his first wife Barbara Douglas (1921–2012) in 1942. They had two children, Rupert and Jenny, and a grandson, Christopher ("Kit"). After they were divorced in 1956, his second marriage (1965–1969) was to actress Katherine Woodville. From 1973 to 1991, Macnee owned a home in the Deep Well neighborhood of Palm Springs, California. His third marriage was to Baba Majos de Nagyzsenye, daughter of opera singer Ella Némethy. It lasted from 1988 until her death in 2007. Macnee became a United States citizen in 1959. He dedicated his autobiography, which he titled Blind in One Ear: The Avenger Returns (1988), to Marie Cameron. Later in life, Macnee was an enthusiastic naturist.

Death
On 25 June 2015, Macnee died at Rancho Mirage, California, his home for the previous four decades, at the age of 93.

Filmography
For credit listings reference

Film

Television

Documentaries
 Real Ghost Stories: The Dead and the Restless (1997)
 Real Ghost Stories: The Wild West of the Dead (1997)
 Real Ghost Stories: Spirits, Graveyards & Ghostbusters (1997)
 Real Ghost Stories: The Poltergeists (1997)
 Real Ghost Stories: The London Underworld & Beyond (1997)
 Unexplained Mysteries: Nostradamus (1999 Front Row Entertainment, Inc.)
 Unexplained Mysteries: Out of Body Experience (1999 Front Row Entertainment, Inc.)
 Unexplained Mysteries: Haunted Historic Sites (1999 Front Row Entertainment, Inc.)
 Unexplained Mysteries: Miracle Healings (2000 Front Row Entertainment, Inc.)
 Unexplained Mysteries: World of Satanism (2000 Front Row Entertainment, Inc.)
 Unexplained Mysteries: Jack The Ripper (2001 Front Row Entertainment, Inc.)
 Unexplained Mysteries: Cryonics (2001 Front Row Entertainment, Inc.)
 Ian Fleming: 007's Creator (2000)
 The Spirit of Diana (2003)
 Unlocking DaVinci's Code (2004)
 The Witnessing of Angels (2010)
 Real Ghost Stories: Hollywood Ghosts (2010)
Notes

Music videos
 The Pretenders – "Don't Get Me Wrong" (1986) (Steed in original Avengers footage)
 Oasis – "Don't Look Back in Anger" (1996)

References

External links

 Patrick Macnee official website
 
 
 
 
 
 Avengers: The Journey Back
 Patrick Macnee  at TV.com 
 Patrick Macnee; Aveleyman.com
 Patrick Macnee on This Is Your Life

1922 births
2015 deaths
English male film actors
English male television actors
English emigrants to the United States
English people of Scottish descent
Male actors from London
Alumni of the Webber Douglas Academy of Dramatic Art
People educated at Eton College
Royal Navy officers of World War II
People from Paddington
Actors from Palm Springs, California
People from Rancho Mirage, California